Spain competed at the 2018 Summer Youth Olympics, in Buenos Aires, Argentina from 6 to 18 October 2018.

Medalists

Archery

Spain qualified one archer based on its performance at the 2017 World Archery Youth Championships. Later, Spain qualified a male archer based on its performance at the 2018 European Youth Championships.

Athletics

 Men's 400 metres - 1 quota place (Bernat Erta)
 Men's 800 metres - 1 quota place (Eric Guzmán)
 Men's 3000 metres - 1 quota (Hugo De Miguel)
 Men's 400 metres hurdles - 1 quota (Ignacio Saez)
 Men's 2000 metres steeplechase - 1 quota (Pol Oriach)
 Men's pole vault - 1 quota (Artur Coll)
 Men's discus throw - 1 quota place 
 Men's cross country race - 2 quotas (Hugo De Miguel, Pol Oriach)
 Women's 100 metres - 1 quota (Laura Pintiel)
 Women's 200 metres - 1 quota (Esperança Cladera)
 Women's 400 metres - 1 quota (Andrea Jiménez)
 Women's 800 metres - 1 quota (Lucía Sicre)
 Women's 100 metres hurdles (Isabel Velasco)
 Women's 400 metres hurdles (Carla García)
 Women's 2000 metres steeplechase - 1 quota (María González)
 Women's 5000 metres race walk - 1 quota place (Ana Pulgarin)
 Women's pole vault - 1 quota (Ana María Chacón)
 Women's triple jump - 1 quota place María Vicente
 Women's hammer throw - 1 quota place (Aitana Safont)
 Women's cross country race - 1 quota (María González)

Badminton

Spain qualified one player based on the Badminton Junior World Rankings.

Singles

Team

Basketball

Spain qualified a female team due to their position at the FIBA U18 3x3 National Federation Ranking.

Shoot-out contest

Beach handball

Spain qualified a boys' team (9 athletes) to the tournament. However, due to the rules of the Games only allowing the National Olympic Committees (NOCs) to enter one team sport (futsal, beach handball, field hockey or rugby sevens) per gender, it has not yet been made official in which event they will participate.

Beach volleyball

Spain qualified a girls' team based on their performance at 2017-18 European Youth Continental Cup Final.

Canoeing

Spain qualified three athletes based on its performance at the 2018 World Qualification Event in Barcelona.

Cycling

Spain qualified a boys' combined team based on its ranking in the Youth Olympic Games Junior Nation Rankings.

 Boys' combined team - 1 team of 2 athletes

Diving

Fencing

Spain qualified one athlete based on its performance at the 2018 FIE Cadet World Championships.

Futsal

Spain qualified the girls' team (10 athletes) to the tournament. However, due to the rules of the Games only allowing the NOCs to enter one team sport (futsal, beach handball, field hockey or rugby sevens) per gender, it has not yet been made official in which event they will participate.

Golf

Individual

Team

Gymnastics

Artistic
Spain qualified one gymnast based on its performance at the 2018 European Junior Championship.

Girls

Rhythmic
Spain qualified one rhythmic gymnast based on its performance at the European qualification event.

Trampoline
Spain qualified two athletes based on its performance at the European trampoline qualification event.

Multidiscipline

Judo

Team

Modern pentathlon

Spain qualified one pentathlete based on its performance at the European Youth Olympic Games Qualifier.

Roller speed skating

Spain qualified two roller skaters based on its performance at the 2018 Roller Speed Skating World Championship.

 Boys' combined speed event - Ivan Galar
 Girls' combined speed event - Nerea Langa

Rowing

Spain qualified one boat based on its performance at the 2017 World Rowing Junior Championships.

Qualification Legend: FA=Final A (medal); FB=Final B (non-medal); FC=Final C (non-medal); FD=Final D (non-medal); SA/B=Semifinals A/B; SC/D=Semifinals C/D; R=Repechage

Sailing

Spain qualified two boats based on its performance at the 2018 World Championships.

Shooting

Spain qualified one sport shooter based on its performance at the 2018 European Championships.

Individual

Team

Swimming

Boys

Girls

Mixed

Sport climbing

Spain qualified one sport climber based on its performance at the 2017 World Youth Sport Climbing Championships.

Taekwondo

Spain qualified one quota based on its performance at the 2018 qualification event in Tunisia.

Tennis

Triathlon

Spain qualified one athlete based on its performance at the 2018 European Youth Olympic Games Qualifier.

Individual

Relay

Weightlifting

Spain  qualified one athlete based on its performance at the 2018 European Youth Championships, and was reallocated in the men's event.

References

2018 in Spanish sport
Nations at the 2018 Summer Youth Olympics
Spain at the Youth Olympics